Kid Cop is a 1993 South Korean children's film directed by Lee Joon-ik, starring Kim Min-jung and Jung Tae-woo. Kid Cop is sometimes referred to as the "Korean Home Alone" due to the bigger emphasis of children's roles in movies.

Plot
Junho plans to give a present to his favorite female friend, Eunsu. However, Junho's plan failed due to Hyungtae's advancement towards Eunsu. This has prompted Junho to go to a shopping mall, where Eunsu's favorite singer holds a fan meeting. The kids meet together and disturbed the shopping mall. A security guard eventually catches them. On the other hand, the robbers are planning to take over the shopping mall. It is up to the kids to defeat the robber.

Casts
 Jung Tae-woo as Junho
 Kim Min-jung as Eunsu
 Dokgo Young-jae as the robber boss
 Jang Se-jin as the robber

References

External links
 

1993 films
South Korean children's films
Films directed by Lee Joon-ik
1990s Korean-language films
1993 directorial debut films